Danilochkin is a Russian masculine surname, its feminine counterpart is Danilochkina. It may refer to
Elena Kirillova (née Danilochkina in 1986), Russian basketball player
Sergey Danilochkin (born 1971), Russian economist
Yuri Danilochkin (born 1991), Belarusian alpine skier

Russian-language surnames